The 2005 Superbike World Championship was the eighteenth FIM Superbike World Championship season. The season started on 26 February at Losail and finished on 9 October at Magny-Cours after 12 rounds and 23 races (the second race at the Imola round was cancelled due to heavy rain). 2005 saw the return of the Japanese manufacturers with major teams from all four Japanese manufacturers ran through European importers' teams.

Troy Corser won his second riders' championship, contributing to Suzuki's first World Superbike manufacturers' championship.

Race calendar and results

Championship standings

Riders' standings

Manufacturers' standings

Entry list

All entries used Pirelli tyres.

References

 
Superbike World Championship seasons
World